The following is a list of episodes for the British crime drama Agatha Christie's Poirot, featuring David Suchet as Poirot, which first aired on ITV from 8 January 1989 to 13 November 2013. In total 70 episodes were produced over 13 series.

Episodes run for either approximately 50 minutes or 90–100 minutes, the latter of which is the format of all episodes from series 6 onwards. The shorter episodes are based on Christie's short stories featuring Poirot, many published in the 1920s, and are considerably embellished from their original form. The longer episodes are based on Christie's 33 Poirot novels and one short story collection (The Labours of Hercules). While Christie's novels are set contemporaneously with the time of writing (between the 1920s and 1970s), 1936 was chosen as the year in which to place the majority of Poirot episodes; references to events such as the Jarrow March were included to strengthen this chronology. With some exceptions, the series as a whole is set in roughly chronological order between 1935 and 1939, just prior to the Second World War.

Series overview

Episodes

Series 1 (1989)
All episodes from series 1–5 are 50 minutes long, except where marked as "feature-length".

Series 2 (1990)

Series 3 (1990–91)

Series 4 (1992)

Series 5 (1993)

Series 6 (1995–96)
All episodes are feature-length from this point onwards.

Series 7 (2000)

Series 8 (2001–02)

Series 9 (2003–04)

Series 10 (2006)

Series 11 (2008–09)

Series 12 (2010–11)

Series 13 (2013)

Combined stories
A number of Hercule Poirot stories were not directly adapted, although most were re-worked by Christie into later stories and filmed in these iterations. These are:

See also
Hercule Poirot in literature

Footnotes

References

External links
 List of Agatha Christie's Poirot episodes from imdb.com

List of Agatha Christie's Poirot episodes
Agatha Christie's Poirot episodes